Dumitru I. Cocorăscu was a Romanian general who was one of the generals of the Romanian Land Forces in the First World War. He served as a brigade commander and division commander in the 1916 campaign.

Military career
After graduating from the military school of officers with the rank of second lieutenant, Cocorăscu held various positions in the infantry units or in the upper echelons of the army, the most important being the commander of the 40th Infantry Regiment and head of Section 1 of the General Staff. He was promoted to the rank of colonel on June 25, 1906.

At the mobilization of the army at the beginning of World War I, Cocorăscu was recalled to the activity, fulfilling the functions of commander of the 21st Infantry Brigade, between August 14 to August 27 and September 6 to September 19, 1916 and he was commander of the 11th Infantry Division, between September 6 to 19 and November 25 to December 8, 1916, distinguishing himself during the First Battle of the Jiu Valley in 1916, after which he was promoted to the rank of brigadier general.

Following the Battle for Bucharest, he was accused of non-execution of orders. He was later acquitted of the charge, being permanently placed in reserve in January 1917.

Works
 Handbook of theories containing the necessary and required knowledge of the infantry soldier by Dimitrie Cocorescu, Lieutenant in the 2nd Hunters Battalion. Bucharest (Tipo-Lit. Eduard Wiegand The successor of the company Stefan Mihalescu), 1887
 The Military Encyclopedic Manual covers: all the knowledge necessary for the officers of: infantry, cavalry, administration and administration in different circumstances such as: general inspections; entrance exams in the School of War; deputy exams cl. II, major exams, etc., by Major Cocorescu. Part I. Text. Târgoviște (Typ. And leg. Of books Viitorul, Elie Angelescu), 1898
 The manual of the soldier, the student of the corporal and the student of the sergeant in the infantry weapon, [by] D. I. Cocorescu, Colonel in reserve. Târgu-Jiu, Edit. Type. N. D. Miloșescu, 1916
 Draft statutes for cattle insurance, [by] D. I. Cocorăscu. Bucharest (Tip. Universala, Iancu Ionescu), 1910
 Elementary studies on the art of war collected and laid in accordance with the prescriptions required for: major exams; the entrance exams in the high school of war and the general inspections by Major Cocorescu. [Vol. I]: Introduction to the art of war. [Vol. II]. Mobilization. [Vol. III]. Strategy. Bucharest (Tip. And Thoma Basilescu Letter Foundry), 1899
 Tactics by Major Cocorescu. Fasc. III. Bucharest (Tip. And Thoma Basilescu Letter Foundry), 1903
Translations:
 Vial, J. Art and military history course. Translated by D. Cocorescu et al, Ed. III. Vol. I-II. Bucharest, 1889–1890.

References

Bibliography
 Constantin Kirițescu, History of the war for the unification of Romania, Scientific and Encyclopedic Publishing House, Bucharest, 1989
 Alexandru Ioanițiu (Lt.-Colonel), The Romanian War: 1916–1918, vol 1, Genius Printing House, Bucharest, 1929
 Romania in the World War 1916–1919, Documents, Annexes, Volume 1, Official Gazette and State Printing Offices, Bucharest, 1934
 The General Headquarters of the Romanian Army. Documents 1916–1920, Machiavelli Publishing House, Bucharest, 1996
 Military history of the Romanian people, vol. V, Military Publishing House, Bucharest, 1989
 Romania in the years of the First World War, Military Publishing House, Bucharest, 1987
 Romania in the First World War, Military Publishing House, 1979

1861 births
1925 deaths
Romanian Land Forces generals
Romanian military personnel of the Second Balkan War
Romanian Army World War I generals